The physical accessibility of the Metropolitan Transportation Authority (MTA)'s public transit network, serving the New York metropolitan area, is incomplete. Although all buses are wheelchair-accessible in compliance with the Americans with Disabilities Act of 1990 (ADA), much of the MTA's rail system was built before wheelchair access was a requirement under the ADA. This includes the MTA's rapid transit systems, the New York City Subway and Staten Island Railway, and its commuter rail services, the Long Island Rail Road (LIRR) and Metro-North Railroad. Consequently, most stations were not designed to be accessible to people with disabilities, and many MTA facilities lack accessible announcements, signs, tactile components, and other features.

A city law, the New York City Human Rights Law, prohibits discrimination on the basis of disability. Since 1990, elevators have been built in newly constructed stations to comply with the ADA, with most grade-level stations requiring little modification to meet ADA standards. Additionally, the MTA identified 100 "key stations", high-traffic and/or geographically important stations on the subway system, which have been or are being renovated to comply with the ADA. One of the key tenets of the 2018 Fast Forward Plan to rescue the subway system is to drastically increase the number of ADA-accessible subway stations, adding accessible facilities to 70 stations by 2024. In 2022, the MTA agreed in a settlement to make 95 percent of subway and Staten Island Railway stations accessible by 2055.

Background
The Metropolitan Transportation Authority (MTA) has been gradually adding disabled access to its key stations since the 1980s, though large portions of the MTA's transit system are still inaccessible. According to the MTA:

In improving services to individuals with disabilities, the MTA identified stations and facilities where compliance with the Americans with Disabilities Act (ADA) would benefit the most people, analyzing such factors as high ridership, transfer points, and service to major areas of activity. These stations were given priority in our station-renovation program. We are continuing to expand accessibility features to more and more locations.

According to the MTA, fully accessible stations have:
 elevators or ramps
 handrails on ramps and stairs
 large-print and tactile-Braille signs
 audio and visual information systems, including Help Points or Public Address Customer Information Screens
 accessible MetroCard Vending Machines
 accessible service entry gates
 platform-edge warning strips
 platform gap modifications or bridge plates to reduce or eliminate the gap between trains and platforms where it is greater than  vertically or  horizontally
 telephones at an accessible height with volume control, and text telephones (TTYs)
 accessible restrooms at stations with restrooms, if a 24-hour public toilet is in operation
Note: not all station buildings have restrooms.

Major bus stops are also required to have bus stop announcements under the ADA. The MTA is required to maintain these components under the ADA law; for instance, buses with malfunctioning lifts will be taken out of service.

History

1970s and 1980s

In 1973, the Federal Rehabilitation Act of 1973 was signed into law, and one provision of it, Section 504, was initially interpreted to require all public transit systems to become equally accessible to disabled people or risk losing Federal funding. The MTA resisted this interpretation, arguing that making the required improvements would cost more than $1.5 billion. MTA Chairman Harold Fisher argued in favor of a separate transportation system for disabled people since it would be too expensive to make the regular system accessible. The MTA Board, in 1980, voted to ignore the rule in spite of threats from the federal government that the agency would forfeit Federal funding.

On September 27, 1979, the Eastern Paralyzed Veterans Association (EPVA) filed a lawsuit in the New York Supreme Court that sought to block subway modernization projects from proceeding unless elevators were installed in stations, as per a state law that required that access for disabled riders be provided. This was the first lawsuit in New York challenging a state agency for not being in compliance with the Public Buildings Law and the first lawsuit to argue state laws required public transit systems to add wheelchair lifts on buses and elevators in train and subway stations. The lawsuit also charged that the MTA was in defiance of New York's Human Rights Law, which outlaws discrimination, for denying people with disabilities from using public transit facilities. The EPVA decided to go ahead with the lawsuit despite the existence of the Federal regulations because it feared a lawsuit by the American Public Transportation Association (APTA), which sought to overturn the rules as being financially burdensome, might be successful.

In 1981, the Reagan administration reinterpreted Section 504, requiring that transit agencies demonstrate that they were making their best efforts to provide adequate transportation for people in wheelchairs. As a result, the MTA agreed to purchase more than 2,000 buses with wheelchair lifts, which would make 50% of its bus fleet accessible. In 1983, less than a third of the system's 3,600 buses were equipped with these lifts.

In December 1982, the New York State Supreme Court ruled in favor of the EPVA, and on January 4, 1983, the Court judge officially signed an order that barred 10 station renovation projects in the MTA's first Capital Program from proceeding until an agreement was reached regarding accessibility in the New York City transit system, which the MTA appealed. The judge based the ruling on a state law that required wheelchair access to projects that were renovated using state funds. The MTA had argued that it had already provide a transportation option for people with disabilities by ordering buses with wheelchair lifts, and that the state law in question, the public buildings law, did not apply to subway stations, and that the planned projects were repairs, not renovations.

Work at ten station renovation projects underway were placed on hold, and work at 78 others were shelved by the MTA, which feared that work would again be halted by the courts. Following the decision, the MTA asked the New York State Legislature to exempt the agency from the law requiring transportation be accessible to people with disabilities. MTA Chairman Richard Ravitch said that "the costs of station accessibility are enormous and the benefits illusory", arguing that few people would use the elevators, and noting that it would cost $1 million to make each station accessible, and the high cost of maintenance and security requirements.

On December 22, 1983, State Senate Minority Leader Manfred Ohrenstein proposed legislation that would make 27 key stations accessible and provide funding for a paratransit service, allowing renovations at the 88 stations to commence. Following the announcement, the MTA entertained installing elevators at a limited number of stations being renovated for the first time. Senator Ohrenstein estimated that it would cost $25 to 35 million to make the 27 stations accessible, and cost $55 million per year for the paratransit service. $30 million of the cost for paratransit service would be borne by Transit Authority revenues, $7 million would come from fares, and the remainder would come from third party payments like Medicare and Medicaid. The proposed legislation listed ten stations in Manhattan, four in The Bronx, seven in Brooklyn, and six in Queens. The bill also would have required half of buses to be equipped with wheelchair lifts, and created a 15-member Handicapped Transportation Board to oversee the paratransit system.

In March 1984, the MTA, the office of Governor Mario Cuomo, and advocates for disabled people began working on an agreement to permit the agency to begin work on it subway station modernization program. On June 21, 1984, Mayor Ed Koch blocked an agreement that had been reached in principle to resolve the impasse. The agreement would have required the MTA to spend $5 million a year over eight years to make about 40 stations accessible and equipped every bus on the system with wheelchair lifts within fifteen years. He opposed making stations accessible, writing, "I have concluded that it is simply wrong to spend $50 million in the next eight years—and ultimately more—in putting elevators in the subways."

On June 29, 1984, Governor Cuomo and the leaders of the State Assembly and State Senate reached a settlement agreement in spite of Mayor Koch's objections. The agreement amended the New York State Transportation and Building Laws to require the MTA to install elevators in 54 stations, of which 38 were designated in the legislation, while eight were to be chosen by the MTA, with the remaining eight to be chosen by a new 11-member New York City Transportation Disabled Committee. The MTA would be required to spend $5 million a year over eight years to make station accessible and to equip 65 percent of buses wheelchair lifts. At least eight stations had to become accessible within five years of when the legislation took effect. The New York City Transportation Disabled Committee would develop a plan for a pilot paratransit service within 210 days. The service would have a $5 million annual budget. The legislation was signed into law by Governor Cuomo on July 23, 1984, and the MTA Board approved a resolution in agreement with the legislation on July 25, 1984. A settlement agreement was approved on September 24, 1984, allowing the MTA to start work renovating 88 subway stations.

1990s and 2000s
On July 26, 1990, the Americans with Disabilities Act of 1990 was signed into law, requiring all transit systems to making their services and facilities fully accessible to people with disabilities. A provision of the legislation required all transit agencies to submit a key station plan to the FTA by July 26, 1992. As part of the plan, agencies were required to include the methodology they used to select key stations and a timeline for the completion of the accessibility improvements. Though stations were required to be made accessible by July 1993, transit agencies were granted permission to extend the deadline by as many as thirty years. As part of New York City Transit's key station plan, 54 stations were to be made ADA-accessible by 2010.

Between 1986 and 1991, the number of disabled people using buses in New York City increased from 11,000 rides a year to 120,000. In 1991, ninety percent of buses were equipped with wheelchair lifts and ten of the 54 key stations were made wheelchair-accessible; at the time, 20 of 469 subway stations had ramps or elevators. The New York City Transit Authority had also made efforts to improve training for its employees and bus operators to on how to assist people with disabilities and on how to operate wheelchair lifts. At least one train car in each subway train had to be accessible by 1993, and major subway stations were supposed to be retrofitted with elevators or ramps by 1995.

The MTA created the New York City Transit ADA Compliance Coordination Committee (CCC) in June 1992. The committee works to coordinate the MTA's accessibility plan, as well as reaches out to disabled MTA riders. The MTA also provides training to disabled riders, the families of disabled riders, and mobility specialists. Between 1995 and 2019, it has trained 775 passengers.

In 1994, amendments were made to the New York State Transportation and Public Building Laws, increasing the key station obligation from 54 stations to a list of 100 stations to be completed by 2020. Of the 100 new stations, 91 were specified immediately, including 37 additional stations that were chosen in accordance with FTA and MTA criteria and discussions at five public forums. The remaining nine stations were to be selected following discussions with the Transportation Disabled Committee and public advocates. However, this revision also stipulated that the subway and Staten Island Railway were exempt from making accessibility modifications that were, by law, required for other public buildings. Shortly after this modification, 66th Street–Lincoln Center and Prospect Park–Brighton were added to the list of 91 stations. There were also three options for modifying the list of 91 stations. They included adding Broadway–Lafayette Street and Bleecker Street; replacing Broad Street with Chambers Street (both served by the ) and Church Avenue with Kings Highway (both served by the ); or modifying dates for several key stations. The public supported all of these options.

On February 25, 1994, the MTA Board approved the submission of the bill to the Governor to expand the key station obligation from the 54 stations in the plan at the time and 37 additional stations to be completed through 2020. In May 1994, the Board approved the addition of contracts to make seven of the 37 stations accessible during station renovation projects between 1994 and 1996 to the 1992–1996 Capital Program. These stations were 14th Street, Eighth Avenue, 207th Street, Church Avenue, 72nd Street, Lexington Avenue and 47th–50th Streets–Rockefeller Center. The first two were set to be awarded in 1994, the next two in 1995, and the final three in 1996. The contracts were added on the assumption that the bill would be signed so as to not delay the projects and to avoid having to return to the stations after their renovation projects were completed to add elevators. These projects required $60.9 million.

The Federal Transit Administration approved the list of 95 key stations in June 2000. Far Rockaway–Mott Avenue and East 180th Street were added to the 100-station list in 2000 and 2002, respectively. Subsequently, a new South Ferry station and the existing Eastern Parkway–Brooklyn Museum station were respectively selected in 2003 and 2004. The hundredth station was the subject of some debate, but the MTA ultimately decided to choose Bedford Park Boulevard.

The MTA started posting a list of out of service elevators and escalators on its website in August 2007. In December 2007, the MTA Board voted on a $1.3 million contract to connect the system's elevators and escalators to a computerized monitoring system so breakdowns could be dealt with more quickly.

2010s
On October 13, 2010, the United Spinal Association filed a class action lawsuit against the MTA for not making the Dyckman Street station accessible as part of a station renovation project, arguing that the agency violated the ADA by not allocating twenty percent of the project budget to improving access to disabled people. The MTA had not planned to make the station accessible due to a lack of funds, and as it was not identified by the agency as a key station. On July 21, 2010, the United Spinal Association announced that it had reached a settlement with the MTA to install an elevator to the southbound platform of the station by 2014. An elevator was not installed to the northbound platform as the MTA argued that doing so was not feasible due to the layout of the landmarked station.

As part of the 2015–2019 Capital Program, $300 million was allocated to enhance station access and provide ADA-accessibility at fifteen stations chosen by the city. Four stations were chosen in January 2018: 170th Street, Broadway Junction ( platforms), Livonia Avenue, and Queensboro Plaza. Four more stations are being evaluated. These stations are the  platforms at Broadway Junction, as well as Union Street, Vernon Boulevard–Jackson Avenue, and East Broadway. In April 2018, the MTA added an ADA-accessibility project at Westchester Square–East Tremont Avenue as part of the 2015–2019 Capital Program.

The MTA hired Stantec in February 2018 to determine the feasibility and cost of making all subway stations ADA-accessible. The study Stantec completed was used to determine which stations would be made accessible the agency's 2020–2024 Capital Program. It found that it would be impossible to make the southbound platform at the 14th Street–Union Square station on the IRT Lexington Avenue Line accessible due to the station's curvature. In addition, making the Court Street station was not found to be feasible due to the significant amount of conduits that would have to be rerouted.

In 2018, as part of the MTA's Fast Forward program to improve subway and bus service, an Executive Accessibility Advisor was hired at New York City Transit Authority chief Andy Byford's request, reporting directly to Byford. However, the MTA's efforts were still seen as inadequate. After a woman died in January 2019 from falling down a staircase at Seventh Avenue, a station with no elevators, officials criticized the MTA for not adding enough elevators, and one advocacy group released an unofficial map of stations that should receive accessibility upgrades.

2020s to present
, ADA-accessibility projects are expected to be started or completed at 51 stations as part of the 2020–2024 Capital Program. This would allow one of every two to four stations on every line to be accessible, so that all non-accessible stops would be a maximum of two stops from an accessible station. In June 2018, it was announced that the Sixth Avenue station on the  would receive elevators following the 14th Street Tunnel shutdown in 2019–2020. As part of the plan to add fifty ADA-accessible stations, the MTA surveyed the 345 non-accessible stations for possible ADA-accessibility. After the accessibility report was released in February 2019, the MTA indicated that it might possibly only retrofit 36 of 50 stations because of a lack of funding. However, in the draft 2020–2024 Capital Program released in September 2019, it was indicated that 66 stations might receive ADA improvements. Plans for ADA access at another 20 stations were announced that December. The news outlet The City did an analysis of the 2020–2024 Capital Program, and found that the cost of replacing nineteen elevators in the system in had doubled from $69 million to $134 million.

On April 23, 2019, the Suffolk Independent Living Organization filed a class action lawsuit against the MTA for not making the Amityville, Copiague, and Lindenhurst stations on the Long Island Rail Road accessible after the agency spent $5 million renovating escalators at the stations from 2015 to 2016. The MTA reached a settlement with the Suffolk Independent Living Organization on July 10, 2020, agreeing to make the three station fully compliant with the ADA, including the installation of elevators. Work on these projects was to be completed by June 2023, with funding to come out of the MTA's 2020–2024 Capital Program. In December 2020, the MTA Board voted to approve a $149 million contract to install seventeen elevators to make seven subway stations and one Staten Island Railway station accessible, and a fifteen-year $8 million contract for elevator maintenance. The MTA used Federal grant money for the Penn Station Access project that would have otherwise expired. The initial cost to make these eight stations accessible was $581 million. The cost of the project was reduced by planning to make the stations accessible without constructing machine rooms, which require additional excavation and underground utility relocation. In January 2022, the MTA added a project to make Massapequa Park station on the LIRR ADA-accessible to the 2020—2024 Capital Program.

In early 2021, the MTA announced it was proposing a zoning law, Zoning for Accessibility (ZFA), which would increase the number of subway elevators by placing many of them on private property. Under the proposed legislation, developers of lots adjacent to subway stations would meet with the MTA to determine whether an elevator entrance could be constructed. If such an entrance was included in a building, the developers could receive "density bonuses" that would allow them to add more space in their buildings. The New York City Council approved ZFA in October 2021, and the first project under the ZFA program was announced two months later. In June 2022, as part of a settlement for two class-action lawsuits, the MTA proposed making 95 percent of subway and Staten Island Railway stations accessible by 2055. This would require installing elevators and ramps at 81 stations before 2025; at another 85 stations between 2025 and 2035; and at 90 additional stations in each of the next two decades. Due to technical limitations, about five percent of stations could not accommodate either elevators or ramps.

Also in 2021, the MTA announced it would install wide-aisle fare gates at five subway stations. After partnering with Cubic to design the fare gates, the MTA would replace existing equipment at select locations in order to make station access easier for wheelchair users and passengers with other wheeled devices such as walkers, strollers, and suitcases. Two years later, as part of a plan to improve bike access in the subway, the agency announced the five stations planned to receive the new fare gates: Astoria Boulevard and Sutphin Boulevard/JFK Airport in Queens, Bowling Green and 34th Street-Penn Station in Manhattan, and Atlantic Avenue-Barclays Center in Brooklyn. As part of this primarily cyclist-focused initiative, the MTA also agreed to consider providing larger elevator cab sizes and elevator redundancy at stations.

Criticism
The MTA has been criticized for its inaccessibility, particularly in the New York City Subway. As of September 2021, just  of the city's 472 subway stations were accessible, among the lowest percentages of any major transit system in the world. There are some lines where two accessible stations are separated by ten or more non-accessible stops. By contrast, Boston's MBTA subway and the Chicago "L", which are as old or older than the New York City Subway, have higher rates of accessible subway stations. A report from the New York City Comptroller published in July 2018 found that, out of the 189 neighborhoods officially recognized by the city, 122 have at least one subway station. Of the 122 neighborhoods with subway stations, only 62 have any accessible stations. Some places such as Woodlawn, South Brooklyn, and Stapleton, as well as neighborhoods with large elderly or young populations, do not have any accessible stations. The Comptroller's report found that approximately 640,000 young, elderly, or disabled residents in the city did not have access to any nearby accessible stations, while another 760,000 residents did have such access. As a result, the unemployment rate tends to be higher among disabled residents of New York City. Additionally, the 25% labor force participation rate among disabled residents is one-third that of non-disabled residents' labor force participation rate of 75%.

Inaccessibility of corridors and major stations
The Rockaway Park Shuttle has only one accessible station (three when extended to Rockaway Boulevard station during summer weekends). Several stations also only contain elevators leading from street level to their respective mezzanines. Additionally, some stations on the LIRR are not accessible, including four consecutive stations on the Babylon Branch, which is entirely above ground.

Several stations that serve major sports venues in the metropolitan area also have little to no accessibility; the Mets–Willets Point subway station, located adjacent to Citi Field (home of the New York Mets), is only accessible through a ramp at a southern side platform, which are only open during special events. Similarly, the connecting Long Island Rail Road station of the same name is not ADA-compliant, nor is the LIRR station serving Belmont Park. The Aqueduct Racetrack subway station, serving the eponymous racetrack in South Ozone Park, was inaccessible until 2013, following a two-year renovation project at the behest of Resorts World Casino, which opened near the racetrack in 2011. Although all New York City buses are accessible, transfers between bus routes, as well as the bus trips themselves, are usually cumbersome because buses run at a much lower frequency than the subway does.

Legal issues
As per the ADA, if a station is significantly modified, at least 20% of the renovation's cost must be spent on ADA improvements, but this is not always the case in the New York City Subway system. For example, the Smith–Ninth Streets station was renovated for two years and reopened in 2013 without any elevators. None of the stations being renovated under the Enhanced Station Initiative, which began in 2017, are proposed to include elevators, except for the stations already equipped with them (e.g. Hunts Point Avenue). The lack of elevators at one station renovated through the ESI, the Cathedral Parkway–110th Street station at Frederick Douglass Boulevard, drew protests by a member of the City Council, a State Senator, and disability rights activists.

There have also been several lawsuits over this issue. What is believed to have likely been the first such suit was based on state law and was filed in 1979 by the Eastern Paralyzed Veterans Association. In 2011, the MTA added a single elevator at the Dyckman Street station after a lawsuit by the United Spinal Association midway during the station's renovation. In 2016, the MTA was sued by another disability rights group for not installing an elevator at the Middletown Road station during a 2014 renovation. Similarly, in 2017, disability rights groups filed a class-action suit against the MTA because the subway in general was inaccessible, which violated both state and federal laws. The federal government sued the MTA in March 2018 over a lack of elevators at Middletown Road and the Enhanced Station Initiative stops. In March 2019, federal district judge Edgardo Ramos ruled that all subway station renovations that "affect the station's usability" must include upgrades to make the station fully accessible unless it is deemed unfeasible to do so. In February 2021, the state-court case reached class-action status with over 500,000 plaintiffs.

Station count

Rapid transit

New York City Subway

, out of  total stations in the New York City Subway system,  (or ) are accessible to some extent; many of them have AutoGate access. If station complexes are counted as one, then  out of the system's  stations are accessible to some extent (or ). Additionally, there are 21 more non-ADA-accessible stations with cross-platform interchanges, as well as other same-platform transfers, designed to handle wheelchair transfers. The MTA is primarily working to make 100 "key stations" accessible by 2020 to comply with the ADA. , 97 of these stations are accessible while 2 are under construction and one under design. It has also retrofitted 35 "non-key stations" and is planning to retrofit 11 more non-key stations.

Because of how they were designed, many existing subway stations were built with narrow platforms, as such making it difficult to install wheelchairs in such stations. Eight station complexes in the system have a mix of accessible platforms and non-accessible platforms.

Manhattan
, there are 60 ADA-compliant stations in Manhattan out of 153, or 44 if stations in complexes are counted as one. Stations built after 1990 are marked with an asterisk (*).

The Bronx
, there are 16 ADA-compliant stations in the Bronx out of 70, or 15 if stations in complexes are counted as one.

Brooklyn
, there are 37 ADA-compliant stations in Brooklyn out of 169, or 30 if stations in complexes are counted as one.

Queens
, there are 22 ADA-compliant stations in Queens out of 83, or 20 if stations in complexes are counted as one. This count does not include Mets–Willets Point, where there is a single accessible platform that is open only during certain events.

Staten Island Railway
, there are five ADA-accessible stations on the Staten Island Railway out of 21. Stations built after 1990 are marked with an asterisk (*).

Commuter rail
, 185 out of the 248 stations in the entire MTA commuter rail system are accessible by wheelchair. Many of them are ground or grade-level stations, thus requiring little modification to accessibility. A few stations, including the entire Babylon Branch, are elevated or on embankments, but some have been renovated or retrofitted with elevators to meet ADA standards.  of the accessible stations in the MTA's railroad system are Long Island Rail Road stations. During the late 1990s, the LIRR began converting much of its low-floor, at-grade stations into high-floor platforms. Rather than renovate to meet ADA standards, ten low-floor stations, including the surviving five on the Lower Montauk Branch were closed on March 13, 1998, due to low patronage, and incompatibility with then-new C3 bi-level coach cars that can only use high platforms. Five of the LIRR's branches are entirely accessible from east of Jamaica: the Long Beach Branch, Montauk Branch, Oyster Bay Branch, Port Jefferson Branch, and Ronkonkoma Branch. The West Hempstead Branch has only one non-accessible station along its line, St. Albans.

On January 8, 2020, as part of the 2020–2024 Capital Plan, the MTA announced the three additional Metro-North stations to receive elevators.

Forest Hills on the LIRR will receive elevators as part of the 2020—2024 Capital Plan as the ramps installed at the station in 1997 are not considered to be ADA-compliant.

Long Island Rail Road
, 106 of the 124 LIRR stations are accessible by wheelchair ramp and/or elevator. Stations that meet full ADA requirements are marked with an asterisk (*). (Other stations are wheelchair accessible but may be missing some ADA features). Stations built after 1990 are marked with a double asterisk (**).

 Albertson 
 Amagansett
 Atlantic Terminal*
 Auburndale
 Babylon*
 Baldwin
 Bay Shore
 Bayside
 Bellmore
 Bellport
 Bethpage
 Brentwood
 Bridgehampton
 Broadway
 Carle Place
 Cedarhurst
 Central Islip
 Centre Avenue
 Country Life Press
 Deer Park
 Douglaston
 East Hampton
 East Rockaway
 East Williston
 Elmont*
 Far Rockaway
 Farmingdale
 Floral Park
 Flushing–Main Street
 Forest Hills
 Freeport
 Garden City
 Gibson
 Glen Cove
 Glen Head
 Glen Street
 Grand Central Madison*
 Great Neck*
 Great River
 Greenlawn
 Greenport
 Greenvale
 Hampton Bays
 Hempstead*
 Hempstead Gardens
 Hewlett
 Hicksville*
 Huntington
 Inwood
 Island Park
 Islip
 Jamaica*
 Kings Park
 Lakeview
 Lawrence
 Little Neck
 Locust Valley
 Long Beach*
 Long Island City
 Lynbrook*
 Malverne
 Manhasset
 Massapequa
 Mastic–Shirley
 Mattituck
 Medford
 Merillon Avenue
 Merrick
 Mineola*
 Montauk
 Murray Hill*
 Nassau Boulevard
 New Hyde Park
 Northport*
 Nostrand Avenue*
 Oakdale
 Oceanside
 Oyster Bay
 Patchogue*
 Penn Station*
 Pinelawn
 Plandome
 Port Jefferson*
 Port Washington*
 Queens Village*
 Riverhead
 Rockville Centre*
 Ronkonkoma*
 Rosedale
 Roslyn
 Sayville
 Sea Cliff
 Seaford
 Smithtown
 Southampton
 Southold
 Speonk
 St. James
 Stewart Manor
 Stony Brook
 Syosset
 Valley Stream
 West Hempstead
 Westbury
 Westhampton
 Westwood
 Woodmere
 Woodside*
 Wyandanch
 Yaphank

Metro-North Railroad
, 79 of the 124 Metro-North stations are accessible by wheelchair ramp and/or elevator. Stations that meet full ADA requirements are marked with an asterisk (*). (Other stations are wheelchair accessible but may be missing some ADA features). Stations built after 1990 are marked with a double asterisk (**).

 Ardsley-on-Hudson*
 Beacon
 Bedford Hills
 Bethel**
 Botanical Garden*
 Branchville
 Brewster*
 Bridgeport*
 Bronxville
 Campbell Hall
 Cannondale
 Chappaqua
 Cold Spring
 Cortlandt**
 Crestwood 
 Croton Falls
 Croton–Harmon*
 Danbury**
 Darien*
 Dobbs Ferry*
 Dover Plains*
 Fairfield Metro**
 Fleetwood
 Fordham*
 Garrison
 Glenwood*
 Goldens Bridge
 Grand Central Terminal*
 Greenwich*
 Greystone*
 Harlem–125th Street*
 Harlem Valley–Wingdale*
 Harriman*
 Hartsdale
 Hastings-on-Hudson*
 Hawthorne
 Irvington
 Katonah
 Larchmont*
 Ludlow (northbound service only)
 Middletown–Town of Wallkill
 Morris Heights*
 Mount Kisco
 Mount Vernon East*
 Mount Vernon West
 Nanuet*
 New Canaan*
 New Haven*
 New Haven State Street**
 New Rochelle*
 North White Plains
 Ossining
 Patterson*
 Pawling*
 Peekskill
 Pleasantville
 Port Chester*
 Port Jervis*
 Poughkeepsie*
 Purdy's
 Redding*
 Riverdale*
 Rye*
 Salisbury Mills–Cornwall
 Scarborough
 Scarsdale
 South Norwalk**
 Southeast
 Spring Valley
 Spuyten Duyvil
 Stamford*
 Tarrytown
 Tenmile River**
 University Heights*
 Wassaic**
 West Haven**
 Waterbury*
 White Plains*
 Yankees–East 153rd Street**
 Yonkers*

Buses
All MTA buses and routes are wheelchair accessible, since all current fleet were built and entered service in the 2000s or later, after the passing of the Americans with Disabilities Act of 1990. , all of the local-bus fleet consists of semi-low floors with wheelchair ramps, while all express buses have high floors and contain lifts.

Many retired fleet are high-level buses, and many of the fleet built before 1990 do not comply with ADA standards. The federal government started requiring that half of all MTA buses be accessible in 1981. However, the wheelchair lifts on the earliest wheelchair-accessible buses were unreliable. By 1983, less than a third of the 3,600-vehicle MTA fleet were accessible, and it was impossible to tell which routes had accessible buses because they were dispatched randomly. Drivers sometimes refused to pick up disabled passengers, or they did not carry keys for lift-equipped buses, or the lifts were operated improperly. As part of a disability-lawsuit agreement in June 1984, Governor Mario Cuomo agreed to equip 65% of MTA buses with wheelchair lifts.

The number of disabled riders on MTA buses rose eleven-fold between 1986 and 1991. By 1991, a year after the ADA law was passed, the bus system saw 120,000 disabled passengers per year. Ninety percent of the fleet was wheelchair-accessible, compared to other cities' transit systems, which had much lower percentages of accessible buses in their fleets. The last non-accessible vehicle in the MTA New York City Bus fleet, excluding routes that later became part of the MTA Bus Company, was retired in 1993.

In the calendar year of 2019, the MTA recorded over 1.5 million bus customers who used wheelchair ramps or lifts. All MTA Bus operators are required to have ADA training. The newest buses have hands-free intercom systems for drivers.

Access-A-Ride

The New York City Transit Authority also operates paratransit services branded as Access-A-Ride (AAR) for disabled customers who cannot use regular bus or subway service in New York City, and nearby areas in Nassau and Westchester counties, within MTA's three-quarter mile service area. AAR is available at all times. In addition, AAR has dedicated pickup locations around the city. Passengers are charged the same $2.75 fare on AAR as on regular transit.

The paratransit system began as a $5 million pilot program following the passage of the ADA law. The services are contracted to private companies. In 1993, because many disabled riders were being refused service in violation of the ADA, the MTA announced an expansion of the program. The service was carrying 300,000 yearly riders back then. In 1998, in response to a discrimination lawsuit, the Access-A-Ride program underwent another expansion. At the time, despite having 1 million annual customers the program only had 300 vehicles and Access-A-Ride journeys often took several hours, while only twenty-six subway stations were ADA-accessible.

The paratransit system has come under scrutiny by the media for being unwieldy: rides must be booked 24 to 48 hours in advance; it is costly to operate; and vehicles often show up late or fail to show up at all. AAR vehicles were defined as being "on time" when they arrived within 30 minutes of the scheduled time, and in 2017, two pilot programs were implemented to speed up AAR service. Nonetheless, its operating cost was $461 million per year as of 2015, which is relatively high considering that only 150,000 people use it every year. Howard Roberts, a former high-ranking MTA official, was quoted as saying that "it probably has turned out to be … a hundred times more expensive to go with buses and paratransit than it would have been to bite the bullet and simply rehabilitate the stations and put elevators in." The Access-A-Ride service competes with options such as accessible taxis, although accessible taxis only make up a small percentage of the city's entire taxi fleet. As part of the 2018 MTA Action Plan, the MTA would improve the Access-A-Ride interface to make the ride-hailing, vehicle scheduling, and traveling processes easier. During the COVID-19 pandemic, there was an increase in the reports of AAR trips that were canceled, in part because of traffic congestion and a shortage of drivers.

Future accessible stations
There were several "station groupings" that were proposed by the MTA in February 2019. At least one station in each grouping is slated to receive ADA improvements. In total, 24 groupings were proposed: three each in Queens and Staten Island, four each in the Bronx and Manhattan, and 10 in Brooklyn. An internal MTA list in July 2019 narrowed down these choices. These stations were included in the list of 48 stations that were confirmed as being under consideration for ADA-accessibility in an announcement in September 2019.

, numerous stations across the MTA system are slated to receive ADA renovations. Those projects are in various stages of planning, design, or construction. The following listing excludes stations that are already accessible but will receive ADA renovations anyway, including Forest Hills on the LIRR Main Line in Queens.

See also

List of Long Island Rail Road stations
List of Metro-North Railroad stations

Notes

References

External links 

 Official September 2021 map of accessible New York City Subway stations

New York City
Accessibility
Disability in law
Metropolitan Transportation Authority